Route 70 is a  north–south state highway in Worcester County, Massachusetts. Its southern terminus is at Route 9 in Worcester and its northern terminus is at Route 2 in Lancaster. Along the way it intersects Interstate 290 (I-290) in Worcester.

Route description
Route 70 begins as the northward continuation of Major Taylor Boulevard at Route 9 as Lincoln Street.  It crosses under Interstate 290 at exit 18, a partial exit, and continues northward, bearing northeastward and crossing under Interstate 290 again at eExit 20, another partial exit.  It passes several shopping plazas before turning more northward onto Boylston Street.  Route 70 passes through the far northwestern corner of Shrewsbury before entering the town of Boylston.  

In Boylston, Route 70 crosses Route 140 and proceeds in an arc near the Wachusett Reservoir. Once the route leaves the concurrency, it heads northward into the town of Lancaster.  

Once in Lancaster, the route passes the former Atlantic Union College and crosses the north branch of the Nashua River before meeting Route 117, joining the route for a quarter mile.  It then turns north again, following the western border of Devens Reserve Forces Training Area (a division of Fort Devens).  Route 70 ends just north of Route 2 at Fort Pond Road, where the ramps from Route 2 west's exit 103.

Major intersections

070
Shrewsbury, Massachusetts
Transportation in Worcester County, Massachusetts